Wesley Grammar School is a co-ed school, founded in 1956, in Accra, Ghana. Wesley Grammar School is located in Dansoman in the Greater Accra region. The Wesley Grammer is a missionary school. Though it is under Ghana Education Service it manage by the Methodist Church of Ghana. The school is situated on about 20acha of land sharing campuses with Methodist University College and the Headquarters of the Methodist Churches.

Notable alumni 
Rebecca Akufo-Addo - First Lady of Ghana, wife of Nana Akufo-Addo
 Most. Rev. Titus Awortwi Pratt - Presiding Bishop of the Methodist Church Ghana.
Gasmilla - Ghanaian Hiplife artist.
Mustapha Inusah - Journalist
DJ Mic Smith - DJ

References

External links

Schools in Accra